γ-Amanitin (gamma-Amanitin) is a cyclic peptide of eight amino acids. It is an amatoxin, a group of toxins isolated from and found in several members of the mushroom genus Amanita, one being the death cap (Amanita phalloides) as well as the destroying angel, a complex of similar species, principally A. virosa and A. bisporigera. The compound is highly toxic, inhibits RNA polymerase II, disrupts synthesis of mRNA, and can be fatal.

See also 
 Mushroom poisoning

References

Cyclic peptides
Phenols
Amatoxins
Hepatotoxins
Tryptamines
Sulfoxides